"E-Bow the Letter" is the first single from American rock band R.E.M.'s 10th studio album, New Adventures in Hi-Fi (1996). It was released on August 19, 1996, several weeks before the album's release. During the same month, R.E.M. signed a then record-breaking five-album contract with Warner Bros. Records. The song features American singer-songwriter and "Godmother of Punk" Patti Smith performing backing vocals. Smith was cited as a major influence by band members Michael Stipe and Peter Buck, and she also provided backing vocals for "Blue", the closing track on the band's final studio album, Collapse into Now, in 2011.

Although the song peaked at number four on the UK Singles Chart, the highest any R.E.M. song charted in the United Kingdom until "The Great Beyond" in 2000, the song fared less well in the United States, reaching only number 49 on the Billboard Hot 100. It became R.E.M.'s lowest-charting lead single since "Fall on Me" released from Lifes Rich Pageant in 1986, when the band was on a smaller record label, I.R.S. Records. Jem Cohen directed the song's music video, which features R.E.M. in Los Angeles and Smith in Prague.

Background and composition

The song is about Stipe's friend, the actor and musician River Phoenix. The title refers to the EBow, an electromagnetic field-generating device that induces sustained vibration in an electric guitar string (creating a violin-like effect), and to a "letter never sent" by Michael Stipe. R.E.M. has also played the song live with artists including Thom Yorke singing Patti Smith's vocal part.

The band described the song as a "folk dirge". Marcus Gilmer of The A.V. Club said that the "dirge-like" song "dabbles in Middle Eastern sounds—thanks to the use of the titular instrument— and features Patti Smith's haunting backing vocals." The song showed how the band's "enigmatic lyrics are glowing clearer, like images emerging on photographic paper". The song's stream of consciousness lyrics, writes Jessica Kennedy of MTV News, "reveal a vulnerable side, full of doubt".

Release
According to biographer David Buckley, New Adventures in Hi-Fi, with its sombre, muted tone, had "no obvious singles or radio hits," although Consequence of Sound noted that R.E.M. could have selected a pop-oriented song like "Bittersweet Me" to trail the album, yet "stuck to their guns". "E-Bow the Letter", one of the album's more introverted songs, was selected by R.E.M. as the lead single. Given its downbeat, "almost dirge-like" nature, spoken word verses, "Dylanesque vocal delivery" and funereal pace, it was considered an unusual and brave choice as it, says Buckley, "it was largely inappropriate for hit radio". According to British chart watcher James Masterton in his column for Dotmusic, the single followed R.E.M.'s typical "marketing habit of issuing one of the most uncommercial tracks from the album as the lead single. Just like 'Drive' back in 1992 the track at first sounds like a monotonous, tuneless mess which has caused radio programmers a few headaches, caught between the demand for people to hear the new single from one of the biggest groups in the world and the fact that it sounds so totally weird."

According to Patrick M. Reilly of The Wall Street Journal, executives at Warner Bros. said that "the band's choice of a droning, dirge-like first single" negatively impacted the album's sales. A retrospective article Consequence of Sound said that the song not only thwarted the album's commercial success, but also for R.E.M. going forward. "It was a proud display of artistic integrity," writes Stephen Troussé, "a label-infuriating demonstration that they commanded complete liberty." David Stubbs of Uncut said the "heavy-duty avant-folk-rock" song was "another of REM’s unapologetic anti-single singles," with another to follow in 1997's "How the West Was Won and Where It Got Us". "Whatever is vexing them is inscrutable to the casual listener; indeed, obscurely compelling as the song is, it seems from one angle like a deliberate attempt to shed extraneous fans."

Mike Mills said the band's choice of lead single was "in reaction to the fact that we've never taken the easy way out. It's important for us to challenge ourselves and the audience. Audiences can respond well to things like that, like putting out 'Drive' from Automatic for the People. That was a very important decision for us, and the record company weren't real thrilled about it, but they trust us and they know we have reasons for what we do, and it usually works out. It didn't do Automatic much harm." Stipe refelected that the group held the ability "to release the most unlikely songs just to push radio as far as we could push them, get more good music on the radio. And there was… for a while. 'E-Bow the Letter' sounded the death knell for us being able to do that! But I think it represents some of my best writing."

Critical reception
Larry Flick from Billboard described the song as "one of the band's typically introspective rock ballads." He added, "Michael Stipe trounces through thickly textured patches of swelling organs, acoustic strumming, and razor-sharp, sparingly placed electric guitars with the sad, furrowed brow and eternally ponderous voice that has become his signature. Patti Smith wraps the song with deceptively soothing incantations that effectively sneak up from behind the music to a full-frontal caterwaul by the track's close. Artful, affecting, and undeniably accesible...three solid traits of any R.E.M. recording."

"E-Bow the Letter" was ranked number 21 on NME magazine's list of the "Singles of the Year". Pitchfork Media founder and owner Ryan Schreiber described it on the website as "possibly one of the greatest songs ever written." Masterton called the song "so totally weird" and compared it to Mott the Hoople's 1972 single "All the Young Dudes", which features similar instrumentation.

Chart performance
On the US Billboard Hot 100, "E-Bow the Letter" debuted at number 54 in the issue of September 7, 1996, reaching its peak of number 49 the following week and spending nine weeks on the chart altogether. The song reached the top five on the Billboard Modern Rock Tracks chart, peaking at number two on September 14, 1996, and entered the top 10 on the Adult Alternative Songs ranking, reaching number seven on September 7 and spending seven weeks on the chart. The song also appeared on the Billboard Mainstream Rock and Maxi-Singles Sales charts, reaching numbers 15 and 39, respectively, on September 14. Along with "What's the Frequency, Kenneth?", it is the only R.E.M. song to appear on the latter listing. In Canada, the track reached the top 10, peaking at number six on the RPM 100 chart and at number one on the RPM Alternative 30. The magazine later ranked the song as Canada's 53rd-best-performing single of 1996 as well as the 30th-best-performing rock song.

In the United Kingdom, "E-Bow the Letter" became the band's highest-charting single until "The Great Beyond" in 2000, debuting and peaking at number four on the UK Singles Chart based on its "typically wry sense of humour". Giving R.E.M. their 18th top-40 hit on the chart, the song spent six weeks in the UK top 100. The song also reached the top 10 in Ireland, where it reached number eight. In Iceland, "E-Bow" the letter rose to number two on the Íslenski listinn chart after seven weeks, eventually ending 1996 as the country's 41st-most-successful single. The track became R.E.M.'s fifth top-10 hit in Norway, debuting and peaking at number six, where it remained for two weeks. In Finland, the song peaked within the top 20, reaching number 11 on the Finnish Singles Chart. Elsewhere in Europe, "E-Bow the Letter" appeared on the charts of Austria, Flanders, Germany, and the Netherlands, achieving a peak of number 28 on the Eurochart Hot 100. In Australia, the song reached number 23 on the ARIA Singles Chart and spent four weeks in the top 50, while in New Zealand, it debuted at its peak of number 32 and left the RIANZ Singles Chart after three weeks.

Track listings
All songs were written by Bill Berry, Peter Buck, Mike Mills, and Michael Stipe, except where noted.
 US CD, cassette, and 7-inch single
UK cassette single
 "E-Bow the Letter" (Seattle studio) – 5:22 (5:24 on UK version)
 "Tricycle" (St. Louis soundcheck) – 1:58 (1:59 on UK version)

 US 12-inch and maxi-CD single
UK and European CD single
 "E-Bow the Letter" (Seattle studio) – 5:22 (5:24 on UK version)
 "Tricycle" (St. Louis soundcheck) – 1:58 (1:59 on UK version)
 "Departure" (Rome soundcheck) – 3:35
 "Wall of Death" (Athens studio)  – 3:07

 Australian CD single
 "E-Bow the Letter" – 5:24
 "Tricycle" – 1:59
 "Departure" (live) – 3:35
 "Wall of Death"  – 3:07

Credits and personnel
Credits are adapted from the US CD single liner notes and the New Adventures in Hi-Fi booklet.

Studio
 Recorded at Bad Animals (Seattle)

R.E.M.
 Michael Stipe – vocals
 Peter Buck – guitar, electric sitar
 Mike Mills – bass, organ, mellotron, moog synthesizer
 Bill Berry – drums, percussion
 R.E.M. – production

Additional personnel
 Patti Smith – vocals
 Scott Litt – production, mixing

Charts

Weekly charts

Year-end charts

Release history

See also
 List of RPM Rock/Alternative number-one singles (Canada)

References

External links
 

1996 singles
1996 songs
Experimental rock songs
Folk rock songs
Music videos directed by Jem Cohen
Patti Smith songs
R.E.M. songs
Song recordings produced by Bill Berry
Song recordings produced by Michael Stipe
Song recordings produced by Mike Mills
Song recordings produced by Peter Buck
Song recordings produced by Scott Litt
Songs about drugs
Commemoration songs
Songs written by Bill Berry
Songs written by Michael Stipe
Songs written by Mike Mills
Songs written by Peter Buck
Warner Records singles